The 1947 Lincoln Lions football team was an American football team that represented Lincoln University of Pennsylvania as a member of the Colored Intercollegiate Athletic Association (CIAA) during the 1947 college football season. In their 13th season under head coach Manuel Rivero, the team compiled a 5–4–1 record and outscored opponents by a total of 164 to 120. The Lions were ranked No. 19 among the nation's black college football teams according to the Pittsburgh Courier and its Dickinson Rating System. 

The team opened its season on September 20, 1947, with a game against Lock Haven State Teachers College in what was billed as "possibly the first regularly-scheduled football game anywhere between a Negro college and a predominantly-white institution."

Schedule

References

Lincoln
Lincoln Lions football seasons
Lincoln Lions football